The 1898 Cleveland Spiders finished with an 81–68 record, good for fifth place in the National League. After the season, the team's owners, Frank and Stanley Robison, additionally purchased the St. Louis Browns from Chris von der Ahe. Claiming disappointment in attendance in Cleveland, they transferred many of the Spiders' better players to the St. Louis team, which they renamed the Perfectos. The Spiders would fold after the 1899 season.

Regular season

Season standings

Record vs. opponents

Roster

Player stats

Batting

Starters by position 
Note: Pos = Position; G = Games played; AB = At bats; H = Hits; Avg. = Batting average; HR = Home runs; RBI = Runs batted in

Other batters 
Note: G = Games played; AB = At bats; H = Hits; Avg. = Batting average; HR = Home runs; RBI = Runs batted in

Pitching

Starting pitchers 
Note: G = Games pitched; IP = Innings pitched; W = Wins; L = Losses; ERA = Earned run average; SO = Strikeouts

Other pitchers 
Note: G = Games pitched; IP = Innings pitched; W = Wins; L = Losses; ERA = Earned run average; SO = Strikeouts

References 

Cleveland Spiders seasons
Cleveland Spiders season
Cleveland Spiders